Simplicity is the state or quality of being simple. Something easy to understand or explain seems simple, in contrast to something complicated. Alternatively, as Herbert A. Simon suggests, something is simple or complex depending on the way we choose to describe it.  In some uses, the label "simplicity" can imply beauty, purity, or clarity. In other cases, the term may suggest a lack of nuance or complexity relative to what is required.

The concept of simplicity is related to the field of epistemology and philosophy of science (e.g., in Occam's razor). Religions also reflect on simplicity with concepts such as divine simplicity. In human lifestyles, simplicity can denote freedom from excessive possessions or distractions, such as having a simple living style.

Some other information

In some contextual uses, "simplicity" can imply beauty, purity, or clarity. In other cases, the term may have negative connotations, as when referring to people as simpletons.

In philosophy of science

The concept of simplicity has been related to in the field of epistemology and philosophy of science.

According to Occam's razor, all other things being equal, the simplest theory is most likely true. In other words, simplicity is a meta-scientific criterion by which scientists evaluate competing theories.

A distinction is often made by many persons. between two senses of simplicity: syntactic simplicity (the number and complexity of hypotheses), and ontological simplicity (the number and complexity of things postulated). These two aspects of simplicity are often referred to as elegance and parsimony respectively.

John von Neumann defines simplicity as an important esthetic criterion of scientific models:

In religion

Simplicity is a theme in the Christian religion. According to St. Thomas Aquinas, God is infinitely simple. The Roman Catholic and Anglican religious orders of Franciscans also strive for personal simplicity. Members of the Religious Society of Friends (Quakers) practice the Testimony of Simplicity, which involves simplifying one's  life to focus on what is important and disregard or avoid what is least important. Simplicity is tenet of Anabaptistism, and some Anabaptist groups like the Bruderhof, make an effort to live simply.

Lifestyle

In the context of human lifestyle, simplicity can denote freedom from excessive material consumption and psychological distractions.

See also

 Concision
 Complexity
 Degree of difficulty
 Elegance
 KISS principle
 Minimalism
 Occam's razor
 Simple living
 Simplicity theory
 Simplification (disambiguation)
 Testimony of Simplicity
 Worse is better
 John Maeda – 10 Laws of Simplicity

References

 Craig, E. Ed. (1998) Routledge Encyclopedia of Philosophy. London, Routledge. simplicity (in Scientific Theory) p. 780–783
 Dancy, J. and Ernest Sosa, Ed.(1999) A Companion to Epistemology. Malden, Massachusetts, Blackwell Publishers Inc. simplicity p. 477–479.
 Dowe, D. L., S. Gardner & G. Oppy (2007), "Bayes not Bust! Why Simplicity is no Problem for Bayesians", Br. J. Philos. Sci., Vol. 58, Dec. 2007, 46pp. [Among other things, this paper compares MML with AIC.]
 Edwards, P., Ed. (1967). The Encyclopedia of Philosophy. New York, The Macmillan Company. simplicity p. 445–448.
 Hickey, Rich (2011) Simple Made Easy
 Kim, J. a. E. S., Ed.(2000). A Companion to Metaphysics. Oxford, Blackwell Publishers. simplicity, parsimony p. 461–462.
 Maeda, J., (2006) Laws of Simplicity, MIT Press
 Newton-Smith, W. H., Ed. (2001). A Companion to the Philosophy of Science. Malden, Massachusetts, Blackwell Publishers Ltd. simplicity p. 433–441.
 Richmond, Samuel A.(1996) "A Simplification of the Theory of Simplicity", Synthese 107 373–393.
 Sarkar, S. Ed. (2002). The Philosophy of Science—An Encyclopedia. London, Routledge. simplicity
 Schmölders, Claudia (1974). Simplizität, Naivetät, Einfalt – Studien zur ästhetischen Terminologie in Frankreich und in Deutschland, 1674–1771. PDF, 37MB 
 Scott, Brian(1996) "Technical Notes on a Theory of Simplicity", Synthese 109 281–289.
 
 Wilson, R. A. a. K., Frank C., (1999). The MIT Encyclopedia of the Cognitive Sciences. Cambridge, Massachusetts, The MIT Press. parsimony and simplicity p. 627–629.
 If Not God, Then What? (2007) by Joshua Fost, p. 93

External links
 Internet Encyclopedia of Philosophy entry
 Stanford Encyclopedia of Philosophy entry

Abstraction
Simple living
Razors (philosophy)